Corybantes veraguana is a moth in the Castniidae family. It is found in Panama, Colombia and Ecuador.

Subspecies
Corybantes veraguana veraguana (Panama)
Corybantes veraguana govara (Schaus, 1896) (Colombia)
Corybantes veraguana parambae (Rothschild, 1919) (Ecuador)

References

Moths described in 1877
Castniidae